The Connecticut Pride (from 1993 to 1994 the Hartford Hellcats) were an American professional basketball team based in Hartford, Connecticut that was a member of the Continental Basketball Association.  They played in Hartford from 1993 to 2000, primarily at the Connecticut State Arsenal and Armory, and also at the Hartford Civic Center and the University of Hartford Sports Center.  Its final season, from 2000 to 2001, was played at the New Haven Coliseum.

The team was previously known as the Albany Patroons, Capital Region Pontiacs, and Hartford Hellcats. With the collapse of the CBA during the 2000/01 season, the team joined the International Basketball League.

Year-by-year

All-time roster

Danya Abrams
Cedric Ball
Darrell Barley
Derrick Battie
Alex Blackwell
Bernard Blunt
Walter Bond
Ira Bowman
Derrick Brown
Troy Brown
Rick Brunson
Keith Bullock
John Coker
Ken Conley
Jevon Crudup
Dan Cross
Corey Crowder
Muntrelle Dobbins
Mario Donaldson
Mark Donnelly
Spencer Dunkley
Brian Edwards
Jay Edwards
Roney Eford
Brian Fair
Isaac Fontaine
Reggie Freeman
Michael Evans
Tate George
Greg Grant
Adrian Griffin
Jermaine Guice
Chris Harris
Otis Hill
Lucious Jackson
Randell Jackson
Ponce James
Chris Jent
Kannard Johnson
Lamont Jones
Shelton Jones
Jeff Kent
John Kimbrell
Kirk King
Rusty LaRue
Todd Lindeman
James Martin
Johnny McDowell
BJ McKie
Rick Mickens
Harry Moore
Ricky Moore
Jeff Myers
Julius Nwosu
Kevin Ollie
Damian Owens
Mike Pegues
Jamie Peterson
Jerry Reynolds
Rumeal Robinson
Tick Rogers
Shawnelle Scott
Tom Sheehey
Willie Simms
Carl Simpson
Charles Smith
Troy Smith
Jarod Stevenson
Justus Thigpen
Charles Thomas
Logan Vander Velden
Antonio Watson
Ennis Whatley
Chuckie White
Aaron Williams
Brent Williams
Theron Wilson
A. J. Wynder

See also 
 Hartford FoxForce

References

External links

Pride
Defunct basketball teams in Connecticut
Continental Basketball Association teams
International Basketball League (1999–2001) teams
Basketball teams established in 1993
Sports clubs disestablished in 2001
1993 establishments in Connecticut
2001 disestablishments in Connecticut
Basketball teams in Connecticut
Sports in New Haven, Connecticut